The 1993 Wyoming Cowboys football team represented the University of Wyoming in the 1993 NCAA Division I-A football season. It was the Cowboys' 97th season and they competed as a member of the Western Athletic Conference (WAC). The team was led by head coach Joe Tiller, in his third year, and played their home games at War Memorial Stadium in Laramie, Wyoming. They finished with a record of eight wins and four losses (8–4, 6–2 WAC), as WAC Co–Champions with BYU and Fresno State and with a loss in the Copper Bowl. The Cowboys offense scored 357 points, while the defense allowed 329 points.

Schedule

Roster

Team players in the NFL
The following were selected in the 1994 NFL Draft.

Reference:

References

Wyoming
Wyoming Cowboys football seasons
Western Athletic Conference football champion seasons
Wyoming Cowboys football